The Bulgaria national cricket team represents Bulgaria in international cricket. The team is organised by the Bulgarian Cricket Federation, which became an affiliate member of the International Cricket Council (ICC) in 2008 and an associate member in 2017. Bulgaria made its international debut in 2004, at the ECC Representative Championship in Slovenia. The majority of its matches since then have come against other European affiliate members of the ICC, including in several European Cricket Council (ECC) tournaments.

History

2018-Present
In April 2018, the ICC decided to grant full Twenty20 International (T20I) status to all its members. Therefore, all Twenty20 matches played between Bulgaria and other ICC members after 1 January 2019 will be a full T20I. 

Bulgaria played their first T20I on 14 October 2019, against Serbia, during the 2019 Hellenic Premier League.

Tournament history

European Cricket Championship
2009: 4th place (Division Five)

Euro Twenty-20
2010: 3rd place

Grounds

Current squad
This lists all the players who have played for Bulgaria in the past 12 months or has been part of the latest T20I squad. Updated as of 11 July 2022.

Records and Statistics 

International Match Summary — Bulgaria
 
Last updated 31 July 2022

Twenty20 International 
 Highest team total: 246/4 v Serbia on 26 June 2022 at National Sports Academy, Sofia.
 Highest individual score: 108*, Saim Hussain v Malta on 14 May 2022 at Marsa Sports Club, Marsa.
 Best individual bowling figures: 4/24, Asad Ali Rehemtulla v Guernsey on 24 July 2022 at Tikkurila Cricket Ground, Vantaa.

Most T20I runs for Bulgaria

Most T20I wickets for Bulgaria

T20I record versus other nations

Records complete to T20I #1711. Last updated 31 July 2022.

See also
 List of Bulgaria Twenty20 International cricketers
 Bulgaria women's national cricket team

References

 'Slogging The Slavs: A Paranormal Cricket Tour from the Baltic to the Bosphorus', by Angus Bell

External links 
Official Site
Cricinfo Bulgaria

Cricket in Bulgaria
National cricket teams
Cricket
Bulgaria in international cricket